Gregory S. Rayl (pronounced "rail", born November 20, 1963) is an American professional stock car racing driver and crew chief. He last competed part-time in the NASCAR Gander Outdoors Truck Series, driving the No. 0 Chevrolet Silverado for Jennifer Jo Cobb Racing and the No. 32 Toyota Tundra for Reaume Brothers Racing.

He has 32 career starts in the NASCAR K&N Pro Series West, most of which came as an owner-driver for GSR Racing.

Racing career
A native of Salida, California, Rayl's first NASCAR action came in 1993 with the NASCAR Featherlite Southwest Tour at Stockton 99 Speedway; he finished 16th after crashing on lap 49. In 2008, he began racing part-time in the NASCAR Camping World West Series; two years later, he ran a full schedule in the now-K&N Pro Series West in the No. 07 Ford, finishing 12th in the standings. At season's end, Rayl received the NASCAR Sportsmanship Award. He formed GSR Racing in 2011, racing the full schedule and finishing 11th in points. For the 2012 season, he stepped back to serve as GSR's crew chief for drivers Cassie Gannis and Trevor Cristiani.

In 2019, he joined Reaume Brothers Racing in the NASCAR Gander Outdoors Truck Series as a crew chief for their No. 34 team. In June, he made his Truck debut in the CarShield 200 at World Wide Technology Raceway at Gateway for Jennifer Jo Cobb Racing, but finished last after wrecking on lap two. He made one more start as a driver, this time for the Reaume team, in their No. 32 at the Canadian Tire Motorsport Park road course race. It was a start-and-park field filler entry at that race as a result of only 29 trucks showing up instead of the usual 32. For the rest of that year, he crew chiefed one of Reaume's trucks (the No. 32, 33, or 34) in each race.

Personal life
On October 14, 2012, he married Nancy J Rayl in El Dorado Hills, California.

Motorsports career results

NASCAR
(key) (Bold – Pole position awarded by qualifying time. Italics – Pole position earned by points standings or practice time. * – Most laps led.)

Gander Outdoors Truck Series

K&N Pro Series West

 Season still in progress
 Ineligible for series points

References

External links
 
 

1963 births
NASCAR drivers
NASCAR crew chiefs
NASCAR team owners
Living people
Racing drivers from California
People from Salida, California